Zopherus championi is a species of ironclad beetle in the family Zopheridae. It is found in Central America and North America.

References

Further reading

External links

 

Zopheridae
Articles created by Qbugbot
Beetles described in 1972